The FIBA Under-15 Women's Oceania Championship is an international women's  basketball competition inaugurated in 2009. The current champions are Australia. 

As of 2017, the previously known FIBA Oceania Under-16 Championship for Women competition (which was a qualifier for the World Cup) is now an Under-15 competition for Oceania teams to qualify for the Asian Championship (from which they can then qualify for the World Cup).

Summaries

Oceania Under-16 Championship

Oceania Under-15 Championship

Medal table

Participation details

References

Women's basketball competitions in Oceania between national teams
Oceania